Streptomyces spongiicola is a bacterium species from the genus of Streptomyces which has been isolated from a sponge from the coast of Sanya City in China.

See also 
 List of Streptomyces species

References

External links
Type strain of Streptomyces spongiicola at BacDive -  the Bacterial Diversity Metadatabase

spongiicola
Bacteria described in 2016